Magne Kvalvik (born 3 July 1973) is a Norwegian rower. He competed in the men's lightweight double sculls event at the 1996 Summer Olympics.

References

1973 births
Living people
Norwegian male rowers
Olympic rowers of Norway
Rowers at the 1996 Summer Olympics
Sportspeople from Porsgrunn